The Legends of Doo Wop is a music group of 1950s doo-wop singers. The original members included Jimmy Gallagher of the Passions, Tony Passalaqua of the Fascinators, Frank Mancuso of the Imaginations, and Steve Horn of the Five Sharks (died July 24, 2013). In 2006, Passalaqua left the group and was replaced by Tommy Mara of The Crests. Johnny Tarangelo, formerly of The Mystics and former Dion backup vocalist, Tommy Moran, are now part of the group, as of June 2016.

References

Doo-wop groups